The La Fayette class (also known as FL-3000 for "Frégate Légère de 3,000 tonnes", or FLF for Frégate Légère Furtive) is a class of general purpose frigates built by DCNS in the 1980s/90s and still operated by the French Navy today. Derivatives of the type are in service in the navies of Saudi Arabia, Singapore and Taiwan.

The ships were originally known as "stealth frigates" due to their unique stealth design at the time. Their reduced radar cross section is achieved by a clean superstructure compared to conventional designs, angled sides and radar absorbent material, a composite material of wood and glass fibre as hard as steel, light, and resistant to fire. Most modern combat ships built since the introduction of the La Fayette class have followed the same principles of stealth.

All information gathered by the onboard sensors is managed by the Information Processing System, the electronic brain of the operation centre of the ship. It is completed by an electronic command aid system.

The ships are designed to accommodate a  helicopter in the Panther or NH90 range (though they are also capable of operating the Super Frelon and similar heavy helicopters). These helicopters can carry anti-ship missiles AM39 or AS15, and they can be launched during sea state five or six due to the Samahé helicopter handling system. France ordered five ships of the La Fayette class in 1988, the last of which entered service in 2001. In the French Navy, they will be incrementally superseded in "first-rank" functions by five frégates de taille intermédiaire (FTI, "intermediate size frigates") from 2024.

French version

Background 

In the late 1980s, the French Navy (Marine Nationale) started the studies for frigates adapted to low-intensity conflicts in the post–Cold War era. The ships were to serve in the large French exclusive economic zone (EEZ), be adapted to humanitarian operations or low-intensity operations in support of land troops, and replace the aging s, which tended to prove too focused on naval operations and were ill-suited for joint operations.

Conventional warships used in low-intensity or humanitarian relief operations proved costly, with their heavy equipment and large crew. Hence came the requirement for lightly armed frigates with economical engines and small crew. These ships were limited to  because the limited size and depth of the Mediterranean Sea and the proximity of the homeland. The French Navy, on the other hand, had to be present in overseas territories, bases and EEZ. To be enduring enough, the ships had to reach , the size of a frigate. The larger displacement allows combining strong firepower (like the Minerva class) and a capacity for a medium helicopter (like the Cassiopea class), along with a good autonomy and seaworthiness.

The first type of ships built on these principles were the s, built on civilian standards, with a limited armament, and carrying a medium helicopter. These ships are high endurance units designed to be operated in overseas territories in the Caribbean Sea, Polynesia, and New Caledonia and the EEZ, where the likelihood of a naval threat is low. The speed is limited to  because of the low-power engines which emphasised autonomy and reliability. To fight pirates in fast rigid-hulled inflatable boats, the Floréals rely on their onboard helicopter and marine detachment.

The niche for more hostile environments is covered by the La Fayette type, designed to operate in complex zones like the Indian Ocean or Djibouti. These ships were to be able to secure the EEZ, but also to operate in naval groups or intelligence gathering missions. The intended role for the ships was in fact very varied, because the experience of the C.70 class, with an intended 20 ships cut down to only nine (the seven s and two s) had taught that project downsizing and reorganisation could lead to badly balanced naval capabilities. The new ships were to benefit from breakthroughs in stealth ("furtivité") achieved by the DCN in the 1980s.

It took several years to refine the concept, and the first ship was eventually launched in 1992, two years after the final design was completed. Weapon system testing took place in 1994, and particularly extensive trials were undertaken to prove the structure of the ship under a wide range of conditions. La Fayette was eventually commissioned in March 1996.

Stealth

At the time of their commissioning, the units of the La Fayette class were the state of the art in stealth for warships. The shape of the hull and the superstructures is devised for the optimal reduction of the radar signature, which has been reduced by 60 percent: a 3,000-tonne La Fayette unit has the typical radar signature of a 1,200-tonne ship. Stealth is achieved with inclined flanks, as few vertical lines as possible, and very clean lines and superstructures: stairs and mooring equipment are internal, and prominent structures are covered by clear surfaces. The superstructures are built using radar-absorbent synthetic materials.

Their radar cross-section is equivalent to that of a large fishing boat, which can make camouflage among civilian ships possible; or that of a much less capable corvette, which could lead an enemy to underestimate the capabilities of the ship. In case of a direct attack, the small radar signature helps evade enemy missiles and fire control systems. The La Fayettes are also equipped with jammers that can generate false radar images, as well as decoy launchers.

Thanks to the adoption of low-power diesel motors and a special heat dissipation system, the La Fayette ships have a low thermal signature. The usual funnel is replaced with a small sets of pipes, aft of the mast, which cool the exit gas before it is released. The ships usually operate in warm areas, which further decreases the thermal contrast with the environment.

The magnetic signature is reduced by the presence of a demagnetisation belt.

The acoustic signature is minimized by mounting the engines on elastomeric supports, which minimize vibration transfers to the hull, and by rubber coatings on the propellers. The La Fayettes are equipped with the Prairie Masker active acoustic camouflage system, which generates small bubbles from underneath the hull to confuse sonars.

Construction

The superstructure is made of light alloy and glass-reinforced plastic, which allow a reduction in top weight. This provides adequate but sub-optimal resistance to fire. Vital zones are armoured in Kevlar, and important systems are redundant. The crew is protected against biological, chemical and nuclear environments.

The ships were built with a modular inner structure from eleven prefabricated modules which were completed at the factory, delivered to the shipyard and assembled there. This technique results in a construction time of less than two years.

The hull has a pronounced angle at the stem, with a short forecastle that integrates directly into the superstructure. The ship's sides have a negative inclination of ten degrees. The single anchor is located exactly on the stem, into which it is completely recessed. The deck where the seamanship equipment and capstans are installed is internal in order to hide it from radar.

The superstructure is built in one piece and directly integrates into the hull, with only a change in inclination. A platform is located between the main gun and the bridge. The superstructure runs continuously down to the helicopter hangar, on top of which short-range anti-aircraft Crotale missiles were initially installed (being replaced on three ships in the early 2020s with the SADRAL/Mistral system).

The ships feature two masts. The main mast has a pyramidal structure which integrates funnels and supports the antenna of the Syracuse military communications satellite system, while the second supports the main radar.

Life extension upgrades

Three of the French Navy frigates (La Fayette, Courbet and Aconit) were selected to receive mid-life upgrades extending their useful service lives into the early 2030s. The three frigates are receiving KingKlip Mk2 hull-mounted sonar to incorporate an anti-submarine capability, modernized point air defence systems (consisting of two renovated SADRAL launchers, removed from the retired Georges Leygues class, and operating Mistral Mk3 SAMs/SSMs) as well as other improvements including the ability to carry the latest version of the Exocet anti-ship missile and CANTO anti-torpedo countermeasures (initially fitted first to La Fayette when she received her upgrade in 2021–22). The first vessel, Courbet, began her conversion refit in October 2020. She returned to sea in June 2021. In October 2021, La Fayette began her planned refit and in November 2022 was declared operational again upon its completion. In February 2023 Aconit, the last of the frigates to be upgraded, began her life extension refit.

, the other two vessels of the class (Surcouf and Guépratte) were scheduled to undergo more modest structural and technical upgrades (with the elderly Crotale SAM to be removed), and be withdrawn from service in 2027 and 2031 respectively. With somewhat reduced general purpose capability, it is anticipated that the two ships will be re-assigned to offshore patrol duties for the remainder of their service life.

From 2024 the La Fayette-class units will be incrementally complemented, and eventually replaced, in first rank functions in the French Navy by the FDI-class frigates.

Ships

Export

Al Riyadh class: Saudi Arabia

The ships' combat systems are produced by Armaris (a DCN/Thales joint venture) and are armed with the Aster 15 missile. The Aster missiles use the DCN SYLVER launcher. As with the La Fayette class the primary offensive weapon is the anti-surface Exocet missile. The ships' main gun is the Oto Melara 76 mm/62 Super Rapid gun replacing the 100 mm TR automatic gun. There are also four  aft torpedo tubes. The ship is armed with the DCNS F17 heavyweight anti-submarine torpedo.

Formidable class: Singapore

The Republic of Singapore Navy's six s are of comparable size to the La Fayette class but differs from that class and the Saudi Al Riyadh class in the armament carried: in place of the Exocet is the Boeing Harpoon. The main gun is a stealth cupola equipped with an Oto Melara 76 mm gun replacing the 100 mm TR automatic gun. The Formidable class also uses the SYLVER launcher/Aster missile combination.

The first ship, RSS Formidable, was built by DCN, while the remaining ships were constructed by Singapore Technologies Marine.

Anti-submarine capability includes S-70B Seahawk helicopters.

Kang Ding class: ROC (Taiwan)

As the ROC (Taiwan)'s defensive stance is aimed towards the Taiwan Strait, the ROC Navy is constantly seeking to upgrade its anti-submarine warfare capabilities. The US$1.75 billion agreement with France in the early 1990s was an example of this procurement strategy: the six ships are configured for both ASW and surface attack. The Exocet was replaced by Taiwan-developed Hsiung Feng II anti-ship missile and the AAW weapon is the Sea Chaparral. The main gun is an Oto Melara 76 mm/62 mk 75 gun, similar to its Singaporean counterparts, the Formidable-class frigates. Some problems in the integration of Taiwanese and French systems had been reported. The frigate carries a single Sikorsky S-70C(M)-1/2 ASW helicopter.

The Sea Chaparral SAM system is considered inadequate for defense against aircraft and anti-ship missiles, so the ROC (Taiwan) Navy plans to upgrade its air-defense capabilities with the indigenous Sky Sword II in 2020. The AMRAAM-class missiles will be quad-packed in a vertical launch system for future ROCN surface combatants, but a less-risky alternative arrangement of above-deck, fixed oblique launchers is seen as more likely for upgrading these French-built frigates.

In 2021 it was reported that the Republic of China would upgrade the Kang Ding class. It was reported that the MIM-72 Chaparral surface-to-air missile defence system will be replaced by the indigenous Sky Sword II. It was also reported that the upgrade of the battle system will also be involved.

The class's Mk 75 main guns have been upgraded and have an improved firing rate of 100 rounds a minute.

Taiwan frigate scandal

The Taiwan frigate deal was a huge political scandal, both in Taiwan and France. Eight people involved in the contract died in unusual and possibly suspicious circumstances. Arms dealer Andrew Wang fled Taiwan to the UK after the body of presumptive whistleblower Captain Yin Ching-feng was found floating in the sea. In 2001 Swiss authorities froze accounts held by Andrew Wang and his family in connection to the Taiwan frigate scandal.

In 2003, the Taiwanese Navy sued Thomson-CSF (Thales) to recover alleged $590 million in kickbacks, paid to French and Taiwanese officials to grease the 1991 La Fayette deal. The kickback money was deposited in Swiss banks, and under the corruption investigation, Swiss authorities froze approx. $730 million in over 60 accounts. In June 2007 the Swiss authority returned $34 million from frozen accounts to Taiwan, with additional funds pending.

Andrew Wang died in the UK in 2015 and collection efforts continued against his family. In February 2021, the Federal Department of Justice and Police said that Switzerland will restitute nearly US$266 million to Taiwan.

In popular culture 
 The La Fayette class is featured in the 2014 video game Wargame: Red Dragon in which it is available to the "BLUFOR" side along with various U.S., ROK, and Japanese warships.

See also
 
 F100-class frigate
 FREMM multipurpose frigate
 
 
 Type 054 frigate
 List of naval ship classes in service

References

Bibliography

External links

 Frégate La Fayette on the site of the Ministry of Defence  
 NetMarine.net  
 Alabordache.com  French Frigate La Fayette on Alabordache.com  

Frigate classes
 
 
Stealth ships
Ship classes of the French Navy